The 2013 St. Petersburg Open was a tennis tournament played on indoor hard courts. It was the 19th edition of the St. Petersburg Open, and part of the ATP World Tour 250 Series of the 2013 ATP World Tour. It took place at the Petersburg Sports and Concert Complex in Saint Petersburg, Russia, from September 16 through 22, 2013.

Singles main-draw entrants

Seeds

 1 Rankings are as of September 9, 2013

Other entrants
The following players received wildcards into the singles main draw:
  Mikhail Elgin 
  Aslan Karatsev 
  Karen Khachanov

The following players received entry from the qualifying draw:
  Mikhail Biryukov
  Samuel Groth
  Dominic Inglot 
  Konstantin Kravchuk

Withdrawals
Before the tournament
  Alex Bogomolov Jr.
  Martin Kližan

Retirements
  Fabio Fognini (right foot injury)

Doubles main-draw entrants

Seeds

 Rankings are as of September 9, 2013

Other entrants
The following pairs received wildcards into the doubles main draw:
  Victor Baluda /  Konstantin Kravchuk 
  Mikhail Elgin /  Alexander Kudryavtsev
The following pair received entry as alternates:
  Dmitri Marfinsky /  Sergey Strelkov

Withdrawals
Before the tournament
  Philipp Marx
During the tournament
  Janko Tipsarević (right wrist injury)

Finals

Singles

 Ernests Gulbis defeated  Guillermo García López, 3–6, 6–4, 6–0.

Doubles

 David Marrero /  Fernando Verdasco defeated  Dominic Inglot /  Denis Istomin, 7–6(8–6), 6–3.

External links
Official website

St. Petersburg Open
St Petersburg Open
St Petersburg Open
St. Petersburg Open